Yoon Chan (born January 3, 1972) is a South Korean actor. He played supporting roles in the films Yellow Hair 2 (2001), Natural City (2003), Hypnotized (2004) and Innocent Steps (2005).

Filmography

Film

Television series

Music video

Musical theatre

References

External links 
 Yoon Chan Fan Cafe at Daum 
 
 
 

1972 births
Living people
South Korean male film actors
South Korean male television actors
South Korean male musical theatre actors
Dankook University alumni
People from Seoul